Nate Smith (born 29 November 1990) is an American professional waterskier. Skiing professionally since 2010, Smith is the current slalom world record holder, setting the record on May 14, 2017. In addition to holding the world record, Smith has won eight major championships.

Biography
Smith was born in Indianapolis. Skiing professionally since the 2010 season, on October 3 of that year he became the youngest skier to ever to compete at 41 off, scoring 3.50 and 5.00 @ 10.25 m. On June 2, 2013 he tied Chris Parrish's world record of 2.00 @ 9.75 m, and on September 7 of that same year broke the record with a score of 2.50 @ 9.75 m. He broke his own world record on May 14, 2017 at the Swiss Pro Slalom with 3.00 @ 9.75 m. The record was declined for irregular driving.

Nate Smith is sponsored by D3 Skis.

Achievements

References

1990 births
Living people
American water skiers
Sports world champions
Male professional water skiers
Pan American Games medalists in water skiing
Pan American Games gold medalists for the United States
Water skiers at the 2015 Pan American Games
Medalists at the 2015 Pan American Games
World Games gold medalists
Competitors at the 2022 World Games